Akçakent is a village in the Nizip District, Gaziantep Province, Turkey. The village had a population of 915 in 2022.

References

Villages in Nizip District